Fanahammeren or Fanahammaren is a residential village area at the eastern end of the Fanafjorden in the city of Bergen in Vestland county, Norway.

The village area was the administrative centre of the old municipality of Fana which existed until 1972 when it was merged into Bergen.  The historic Fana Church is located here.

References

Populated places in Bergen
Villages in Vestland